The 1962 Arkansas Razorbacks football team represented the University of Arkansas in the Southwest Conference (SWC) during the 1962 NCAA University Division football season. In their fifth year under head coach Frank Broyles, the Razorbacks compiled a 9–2 record (6–1 against SWC opponents), finished in second place in the SWC, and outscored all opponents by a combined total of 299 to 115.  The Razorbacks' only loss during the regular season came against Texas by a 7–3 score. The team was ranked #6 in both the final AP Poll and the final UPI Coaches Poll and went on to lose to Ole Miss in the 1963 Sugar Bowl by a 17–13 score.

Arkansas quarterback Billy Moore was selected by the Football Writers Association of America and the Newspaper Enterprise Association as a first-team player on the 1962 College Football All-America Team.  Moore scored 14 touchdowns, which tied him with the Miami Redskins' kicker Bob Jencks in scoring. Future Razorback head coach Ken Hatfield finished second in the country in punt return yards, behind Utah State's Darrell Roberts. Razorback kicker Tom McKnelly was fourth in kick scoring, with 33 extra points and three field goals.

The Razorbacks' offensive unit averaged 5.0 yards per play and 357 yards per game, the seventh-best mark in 1962. Arkansas also averaged 28.6 points per game, the fifth-highest average nationally. Running on the Razorback defense was tough, as the unit gave up 90.7 yards per contest, the seventh-lowest total in the nation.

Despite a 9–2 record, the Razorbacks finished second in the SWC to Texas, which was 9–1–1, losing only in the Cotton Bowl Classic to LSU, 13–0.

Schedule

Sugar Bowl

The 1963 Sugar Bowl matched up rivals Arkansas and Ole Miss in the Razorbacks second straight Sugar Bowl, and fourth bowl in four seasons. The Rebels also had reached four consecutive bowl games.

After each team kicked field goals, Ole Miss scored the first touchdown, a 33-yard strike from Glynn Griffing to Louis Guy that gave the Rebels a 10–3 lead. The Hogs replied with a five-yard touchdown toss from Billy Moore to knot the game at 10. Ole Miss QB Griffing then scored on a one-yard touchdown scamper. The Razorbacks tacked on a field goal, but, as neither team could dent the scoreboard in the fourth quarter, lost by a 17–13 final.

References

Arkansas
Arkansas Razorbacks football seasons
Arkansas Razorbacks football